The Crown Jewels of Württemberg (German: Kronjuwelen des Königreichs Württemberg) are a historical jewel collection belonging to the Kings and Queens of Württemberg.

The original crown jewels were made in 1806 for Frederick I of Württemberg to celebrate Württemberg achieving kingdom status. The Crown of Württemberg consists of Gold, Diamonds, Pearls and Emeralds. Many of the diamonds were donated by the jewel collector Duke Carl Alexander. The crown was never traditionally worn at celebrations. Rather, it was carried during ceremonies such as weddings, New Year's Day celebrations and funerals. The appearance of the crown was last modified during 1897 by the court jeweller August Heinrich Kuhn for King William I of Württemberg. In 1945 the crown was confiscated by French troops from a bank vault in Biberach an der Riß. The crown was later returned to Württemberg-Hohenzollern Parliament.

The crown jewels also include the Diamond Diadem created for Queen Pauline of Württemberg in 1820. Queen Pauline's husband King William I even had several large diamonds transferred from the Crown of Württemberg to the Diamond Diadem. The collection also includes a golden dinner set given to the Württemberg king in 1816 by Grand Duchess (and later Queen) Catherine Pavlovna of Russia.

After monarchy ended in Württemberg the royal family and the State of Württemberg split the crown jewels. Today some of the collection including the Crown and Diadem can be viewed at the State Museum of Württemberg (Landesmuseum Württemberg).

See also
German Crown Jewels
Order of the Württemberg Crown

References

External links
The Württemberg Crown Jewels at the Württemberg Museum (German)

Württemberg
Kingdom of Württemberg
Wurttemberg